Ukhtanga is a rural locality (a village) in Kalininskoye Rural Settlement, Totemsky District, Vologda Oblast, Russia. The population was 7 as of 2002.

Geography 
Ukhtanga is located 44 km southwest of Totma (the district's administrative centre) by road. Churilovka is the nearest rural locality.

References 

Rural localities in Tarnogsky District